Antistrophus is a genus of about 10 species of gall wasps. The genus is only known from the Nearctic. Species of Antistrophus induce galls on plant species in four Asteraceae genera: Silphium, Lygodesmia, Chrysothamnus, and Microseris .

The genus was first named and described by Benjamin Walsh in 1869.

This genus includes the following species:

 Antistrophus bicolor Gillette, 1891
 Antistrophus chrysothamni Beutenmuller, 1908
 Antistrophus jeanae Tooker and Hanks, 2004
 Antistrophus laciniatus Gillette, 1891
 Antistrophus lygodesmiaepisum Walsh, 1869
 Antistrophus meganae Tooker and Hanks, 2004
 Antistrophus minor Gillette, 1891
 Antistrophus microseris McCracken and Egbert, 1922
 Antistrophus rufus Gillette, 1891
 Antistrophus silphii Gillette, 1891

References 

Gall-inducing insects
Hymenoptera genera
Cynipidae
Taxa described in 1869